The 1993 World Juniors Track Cycling Championships were the 19th annual Junior World Championships for track cycling held in Perth, Australia in August 1993.

The Championships had five events for men (Sprint, Points race, Individual pursuit, Team pursuit and 1 kilometre time trial) and two for women (Individual pursuit and Sprint).

Events

Medal table

References

UCI Juniors Track World Championships
1993 in track cycling
1993 in Australian sport